James Edward Service (January 20, 1931 – February 10, 2017) was a vice admiral of the United States Navy active during much of the Cold War. A naval aviator, he flew combat missions in the Korean War and Vietnam War, commanded aviation units and various ships including aircraft carriers, served as a test pilot, and was President of the Naval War College.

Naval career

Services naval career began in November 1950, when he reported for training in the U.S. Navys Aviation Cadet Training Program. He underwent training until June 1952, being designated a Naval Aviator on April 9, 1952.

In July 1952, Service reported for duty with Fighter Squadron 53 (VF-53) at Naval Air Station Miramar, California. The squadron deployed to Korea from January to June 1953, where Service flew F9F-5 Panther fighters on 54 combat missions during the Korean War. He remained with the squadron until October 1954.

From November 1954 to July 1955, Service was a flight instructor at Naval Air Station Corpus Christi, Texas. He then left the Navy to pursue studies at San Diego State College in San Diego, California, through January 1957.

Service returned to naval service in February 1957, joining Attack Squadron 151 (VA-151) at Naval Air Station Alameda, California. During his tour, the squadron deployed to the Western Pacific. Leaving VA-151 in February 1959, he spent March through May 1959 at the Catapult and Arresting Gear School at Naval Station Philadelphia in Philadelphia, Pennsylvania.

From June 1959 to June 1961, Service served aboard the attack aircraft carrier . He then was a test pilot at the Naval Air Test Facility at Naval Air Station Lakehurst, New Jersey, from July 1961 to July 1963, making high-energy landing tests of various arresting gear systems and serving in 1962 as project pilot for the Marine Corps Expeditionary Airfield, becoming the first pilot to launch from the CE-1 and CE-2 cataport systems. He then attended the Naval Postgraduate School at Monterey, California, from August 1963 to June 1965.

After instruction in Heavy Attack Squadron 123 (VAH-123) from July 1965 to January 1966, Service served in Heavy Photographic Squadron 61 (VAP-61) in Southeast Asia from February 1966 to November 1967, first as the squadrons operations officer and then as its executive officer. During this tour, he flew 61 combat missions in the Vietnam War in RA-3B Skywarrior photographic reconnaissance aircraft and participated in the development of tactics for the use of real-time infrared reconnaissance systems under combat conditions. He then served a tour as assistant air officer aboard the attack aircraft carrier  from January 1968 until April 1969, during which Ranger served off Vietnam from January to June 1968 and participated in the response to the Pueblo incident with North Korea of January 1968.

From May to June 1969, Service again underwent instruction with VAH-123, before taking command of his first squadron, Heavy Photographic Squadron 62 (VAP-62), in July 1969. He was the squadrons commanding officer until October 1969, then served first as executive officer and then as commanding officer of VAH-123 during his next tour, which lasted from November 1969 to January 1971. He then was executive officer of the attack aircraft carrier  from June 1971 to June 1972.

Service attended the United States Army War College in Carlisle, Pennsylvania, from July 1972 to July 1973 before returning to sea as commanding officer of the fast combat support ship  from September 1973 to April 1975 and as commanding officer of the aircraft carrier  from June 1975 to April 1977.

Services next tour was at the Pentagon, where from May 1977 to January 1980 he was on the staff (OPNAV) of the Chief of Naval Operations (CNO).  While at the Pentagon, he served first as executive assistant and senior aide to the Vice Chief of Naval Operations (OP-09A) and then, in his first flag officer assignment, as chief of Aviation Manpower and Training (OP-59). He then spent January through May 1980 at the Nuclear Power Training Unit in Idaho Falls, Idaho.

From June 1980 to June 1981, Service was the commander of Carrier Group 8, which operated in the Indian Ocean and participated in the January 1981 release of the American hostages that had been held in Tehran, Iran, since November 1979. From July 1981 to September 1982, he was the commander of Battle Force, Sixth Fleet, and Task Force 60 in the Mediterranean Sea. During this tour, he planned and executed a missile exercise in the Gulf of Sidra off Libya which resulted in two F-14A Tomcat fighters from Fighter Squadron 41 aboard the aircraft carrier  shooting down two Libyan Sukhoi Su-22 (NATO reporting name "Fitter") attack aircraft during the Gulf of Sidra incident of 19 August 1981. He received the Distinguished Service Medal for this operation.

On October 14, 1982, Service became the 42nd president of the Naval War College in Newport, Rhode Island, During his presidency, which lasted until 12 July 1985, he presided over the colleges centennial, the opening of an enlarged Naval War College Museum in Founders Hall after a two-year renovation, and the publication of Sailors and Scholars, a history of the college's first 100 years.

From August 1985 to September 1987, Service was Commander, Naval Air Forces, United States Pacific Fleet, at Naval Air Station North Island in San Diego, California. He retired from Navy service in September 1987.

Awards and decorations

Personal life

Service was married to the former Natalie Harpst. They have three sons, two of whom became naval officers, one a naval aviator, the other a naval flight officer and aviation physiologist.

Retirement

In retirement, Service was a director of the Wood River Medical Center in Ketchum, Idaho, from 1991 to 1995 and served as a financial adviser for the PGR Advisors consulting group in San Jose, California. Starting in 1992, Service sat on the board of directors of the Sturm, Ruger Company, Inc. and was its chairman from 2006 to 2010. He served as "Chairman Emeritus of the Board" from 2010 until his death on February 10, 2017, at the age of 86.

References

External links 
1951 photo of James E. Service during flight training and 1986 photo of James E. and Natalie Service

1931 births
2017 deaths
People from Grosse Pointe, Michigan
Military personnel from Michigan
United States Navy admirals
United States Naval Aviators
United States Navy personnel of the Korean War
United States Navy personnel of the Vietnam War
American Korean War pilots
Presidents of the Naval War College
Recipients of the Navy Distinguished Service Medal
Recipients of the Legion of Merit
Recipients of the Air Medal
Military personnel of the Cold War
San Diego State University alumni
Naval Postgraduate School alumni
United States Army War College alumni